HSwMS Dristigheten was a Swedish Navy coastal defence ship, and the single ship of her class. She was launched 28 April 1900. She was rebuilt as a seaplane tender in 1927. Built in 1898-1901, she was a modified version of the Oden-class of 1894-99, with a slightly longer hull and different armament. The ship was laid down in 1898 at Lindholmens' yard, Gothenburg, launched on 28 April 1900 and completed in 1901. She served without distinction until 1930 when she was stripped for conversion to an aircraft tender. As a seaplane carrier she was given a hangar and deck aft, with cranes to handle three floatplanes. After the Second World War, the old ship was reclassified as a target, and served until 1961, when she was scrapped.

Captains
1919–1920 – Arvid Hägg
1938–1938 – Moje Östberg

References

Coastal defence ships of the Swedish Navy
Ships built in Gothenburg
1900 ships